Forugh Farrokhzad (28 December 1934 – 14 February 1967) was an influential Iranian poet and film director. She was a controversial modernist poet and an iconoclast,  feminist author. Farrokhzad died at the age of 32 due to a car accident.

Early life and career
Forugh Farrokhzad was born in Tehran on 28 December 1934, to career military officer Colonel Mohammad Bagher Farrokhzad (the Farrokhzad family hail from Tafresh) and his wife Touran Vaziri-Tabar. The fourth of seven children (Amir, Massoud, Mehrdad, Fereydoun, Pooran, Gloria), she attended school until the ninth grade, then was taught painting and sewing at a girls' school for the manual arts. At the age of 16, she was married to satirist Parviz Shapour. She continued her education with painting and sewing classes and moved with her husband to Ahvaz. Her only child, a son named Kamyar Shapour (subject of The Return), was born a year later.

"After her separation, and later her divorce (1954), from Parviz, she lost custody of her son because she had had several affairs. Her son Kamyar, whom she affectionately calls Kami, was taken away from her and brought up by Parviz and his family. Forugh was given very few visiting rights, and the child was brought up with the impression that his mother had abandoned him for poetry and the pursuit of her sexual pleasures. The thought of her son thinking that she willingly abandoned him, was a source of great sorrow and constant torment for her."

Farrokhzad spent nine months in Europe in 1958. After returning to Iran, in search of a job she met filmmaker and writer Ebrahim Golestan, who reinforced her own inclinations to express herself and live independently, and with whom she began a love affair. She published two more volumes, The Wall and The Rebellion, before traveling to Tabriz to make a film about Iranians affected by leprosy. This 1962 documentary film, titled The House is Black, is considered to be an essential part of the Iranian New Wave movement. During the 12 days of shooting, she became attached to Hossein Mansouri, the child of two lepers. She adopted the boy and brought him to live at her mother's house.

She published Reborn in 1964. Her poetry at that time varied significantly from former Iranian poetic traditions.

Feminine perspective in Farrokhzad's poetry

Farrokhzad's strong feminine voice became the focus of much negative attention and open disapproval, both during her lifetime and in posthumous reception of her work.

In a radio interview, when asked about the feminine perspective in her poems, Farrokhzad replied: "If my poems, as you say, have an aspect of femininity, it is of course quite natural. After all, fortunately, I am a woman. But if you speak of artistic merits, I think gender cannot play a role. In fact to even voice such a suggestion is unethical. It is natural that a woman, because of her physical, emotional, and spiritual inclinations, may give certain issues greater attention, issues that men may not normally address. I believe that if those who choose art to express their inner self, feel they have to do so with their gender in mind, they would never progress in their art -- and that is not right. So when I write, if I keep thinking, oh I'm a woman and I must address feminine issues rather than human issues, then that is a kind of stopping and self-destruction. Because what matters, is to cultivate and nourish one's own positive characteristics until one reaches a level worthy of being a human. What is important is the work produced by a human being and not one labelled as a man or a woman. When a poem reaches a certain level of maturation, it separates itself from its creator and connects to a world where it is valid based on its own merits." Emphasizing human issues, she also calls for a recognition of women's abilities that goes beyond the traditional binary oppositions:

Death

Farrokhzad died in a car accident on 14 February 1967, at the age of 32. Although the exact circumstances of her demise have been the subject of much debate, the official story is that she swerved her jeep to avoid an oncoming school bus and was thrown out of her car, hitting her head against the curb. It was believed she died before reaching the hospital, however, Farzaneh Milani in her book, Forugh Farrokhzad: A Literary Biography With Unpublished Letters / فروغ فرخ زاد: زندگی نامه ادبی همراه با نامه های چاپ نشده (Farsi), cites an interview with Ebrahim Golestan who speaks about Farrokhzad's final moments where she died in his arms.  Farrokhzad's poem "Let Us Believe in the Dawn of the Cold Season" was published posthumously, and is considered by some to be one of the best-structured modern poems in Persian.

Legacy

Farrokhzad's poetry was banned for more than a decade after the Islamic Revolution. A brief literary biography of Farrokhzad, Michael Hillmann's A lonely woman: Forough Farrokhzad and her poetry, was published in 1987. Farzaneh Milani's work Veils and words: the emerging voices of Iranian women writers (1992) included a chapter about her. Abdolali Dastgheib, literary critic writer, published a critical review of Farrokhzad's poems titled 'The Little Mermaid' (Farsi title پری کوچک دریا) (2006) in which he describes Forugh as a pioneer in modern Farsi poetry who symbolizes feminism in her work.
Nasser Saffarian has directed three documentaries about her life: The Mirror of the Soul (2000), The Green Cold (2003), and Summit of the Wave (2004), and Sholeh Wolpé has written a short biography of Farrokhzad's life in "Sin: Selected Poems of Forugh Farrokhzad" (2007).

In February 2017, on the occasion of the 50th anniversary of Farrokhzad's death, the 94-year-old Golestan broke his silence about his relationship with her, speaking to Saeed Kamali Dehghan of The Guardian. "I rue all the years she isn't here, of course, that's obvious," he said. "We were very close, but I can't measure how much I had feelings for her. How can I? In kilos? In metres?"

Sholeh Wolpé writes, "Farrokhzad is Iran's most revered female poet. She was a poet of great audacity and extraordinary talent. Her poetry was the poetry of protest-- protest through revelation-- the revelation of the innermost world of women (considered taboo until then), their intimate secrets and desires, their sorrows, longings, aspirations and at times even their articulation through silence. Her poems are still relevant in their advocacy for women's liberation and independence."

Translations of Farrokhzad's works
 Arabic: Mohammad Al-Amin, Gassan Hamdan
 Azeri: Samad Behrangi
 English: 
 Let Us Believe in the Beginning of the Cold Season, translated and edited by Elizabeth T. Gray, Jr., (New Directions Publishing, 2022) .
 Sin: Selected Poems of Forugh Farrokhzad, translated and edited by Sholeh Wolpé, (Fayetteville, Arkansas: University of Arkansas Press, 2007) .
 Another Birth: Selected Poems, translated by Ali Salami, (Zabankadeh Publications, 2001) . 
 Hasan Javadi and Susan Sallée translated Another Birth: Selected Poems of Forugh Farrokhzad with her letters and interviews in 1981. A revised edition of the same volume is published by Mage Publishers (Washington, DC) in 2010 as a bilingual edition.
 Bride of Acacias: Selected Poems of Forugh Farrokhzad, translated by Jascha Kessler and Amin Banani, (Caravan Books, Delmar, N.Y., 1982) .
 A Rebirth: Poems, translated by David Martin, with a critical essay by Farzaneh Milani (Mazda Publishers, Lexington Ky., 1985) .
 I Pity The Garden was included in The Green Book of Poetry edited by Ivo Mosley, (Frontier Publishing, Norfolk, 1993), later reprinted as Earth Poems: Poems From Around The World To Honor The Earth (HarperSanFrancisco, 1996) .
 French: Mahshid Moshiri, Sylvie Mochiri (pen name : Sylvie M. Miller)
 Hebrew: Sivan Balslev
 German: Annemarie Schimmel
 Italian: Domenico Ingenito
 Kurdish: Haidar Khezri, It is Only Sound that Remains: The Life and Legacy of Forough Farrokhzad, with Translation of Two Collections of her Poetry ("Another Birth" and "Let Us Believe in the Beginning of the Cold Season"), published by Salahaddin University Press 2016.
 Nepali: Collected in Manpareka Kehi Kavita translated by Suman Pokhrel
 Russian: Viktor Poleshchuk
 Swedish: Namdar Nasser
 Turkish: Hashem Khosrow-Shahi, Jalal Khosrow-Shahi
 Urdu: Fehmida Riaz published by 'Sheherzade Publications' Karachi
 Uzbek: 
Khurshid Davron published by "Qirq bir oshiq daftari" Tashkent
 "Qayg'u guli", Tashkent, 2019-yil

Bibliography 
Sholeh Wolpé, Sin: Selected Poems of Forugh Farrokhzad, (Fayetteville [Arkansas]: University of Arkansas Press, 2007). 
Michael Craig Hillmann, A lonely woman: Forough Farrokhzad and her poetry (Three Continents Press, Washington, D.C., 1987). , .

Documentaries and other works

Only Voice Remains, English language award-winning short experimental documentary about Forugh Farrokhzad using Sholeh Wolpe's translations. Directed by London Based filmmaker Makez Rikweda.
I Shall Salute the Sun Once Again, English-language documentary about Forough Farrokhzad, by Mansooreh Saboori, Irandukht Productions 1998.
 Moon Sun Flower Game, German documentary about Forough Farrokhzad's adopted son Hossein Mansouri, by Claus Strigel, Denkmal-Film 2007.
 The Bride of Acacias, a play about Forough Farrokhzad by Ezzat Goushegir.
 Song of a captive bird, a novel about Forough Farrokhzad by Jasmin Darznik.

Further reading
Sholeh Wolpé, Sin: Selected poems of Forugh Farrokhzad, (Fayetteville [Arkansas]: University of Arkansas Press, 2007). 
Manijeh Mannani, The Reader's Experience and Forough Farrokhzad's Poetry, Crossing Boundaries - an interdiciplinary journal, Vol. 1, pp. 49–65 (2001).
 Michael Craig Hillmann, An Autobiographical Voice: Forough Farrokhzad, in Women's Autobiographies in Contemporary Iran, edited by Afsaneh Najmabadi (Cambridge [Massachusetts]: Harvard University Press, 1990). .
 Ezzat Goushegir, The Bride of Acacias, (a play about Forough Farrokhzad).
 Chopra, R M, "Eminent Poetesses of Persian", Iran Society, Kolkata, 2010.
 Dastgheib, Abdolali. 2006. The Little Mermaid, Critical Review of poems by Forough Farrokhzad. Amitis Publishers, Tehran, Iran. . (Farsi title پری کوچک دریا).
 Mohammad Reza Vaez Shahrestani, Forough's Existentialist Lifeworld: A Minimalist Reading, Literature & Aesthetics'' 28 (2): 33-50. 2018.

See also

 Mina Assadi
 Simin Behbahani
 Parvin E'tesami
 Ebrahim Golestan

References

External links

Website with poems by Farrokhzad
Words Without Borders Campus
The Legendary Iranian Poet Who Gave Me Hope, Literary Hub 
Interview on Pusle Berlin
FAFND 
I Have Sinned. Forugh Farrokhzad in Best American Poetry blog
Another website containing her poems in English 
Iran Chamber's Article on Forugh
Farrukhzad, Forugh, a biography by Professor Iraj Bashiri, University of Minnesota
Women Voices for Change
Terrestrial Verses Forough's poem translated by Mohammad Rajabpur
Iranian.com audio archive of her poems, Listen to some of her poems by her own voice
Forough Farrokhzad's Resume
Interview with Simin Behbahani on the occasion of the fortieth anniversary of Forugh Farrokhzad's death on Thursday 13 February 2007 (BBC Persian)
Forugh Farrokhzad's poem Reborn as translated and recited by Sholeh Wolpé
 (website about her)

Persian-language poets
20th-century Iranian poets
Iranian documentary filmmakers
Iranian film directors
Iranian women film directors
People from Tehran
1935 births
1967 deaths
Road incident deaths in Iran
Persian-language women poets
20th-century women writers
20th-century poets
Iranian women writers
Women documentary filmmakers
Poets from Tehran